Gary Sherman (born 28 August 1945) is an American film director, screenwriter, and producer from Chicago, Illinois. He is best known for his prolific work in the horror film genre, directing films such as Death Line, Dead & Buried, and Poltergeist III.

Life and career
Sherman began his career directing short films, commercials, industrials, and documentaries while still an undergraduate at IIT's Institute of Design. After graduating, Gary moved to London, England, where he continued directing commercials and also co-wrote and directed his first feature film, Death Line starring Donald Pleasence. The British Film Institute called this debut "The Most Significant Directorial Debut of the Year".

In 1979 Sherman filmed the television movie Mysterious Two based on the exploits of Marshall Applewhite and Bonnie Nettles, the then relatively unknown leaders of the Heaven's Gate cult, though it was not aired until 1982.

Upon relocating to Los Angeles, California, he continued writing and collaborating on many feature scripts. He also wrote and directed several television pilots. Avco-Embassy producer Ronald Shusett asked Sherman to direct the 1981 horror film Dead & Buried, and Sherman followed that film with the action-thriller Vice Squad shot by Stanley Kubrick's DP John Alcott. Like Death Line, these films often polarized critics and audiences and have since gone on to become genre classics.

Next he co-wrote and directed the thriller Wanted: Dead or Alive starring Rutger Hauer and Gene Simmons. Teamed with Gene, the award-winning Rock Against Drugs public service campaign for MTV came about as well as the pilot for the ABC series Sable.

His next project was Poltergeist III for MGM, which was shot on location in Chicago between April–June 1987 (with a theatrical release scheduled for June, 1988). After the completed film was rated PG by the MPAA in November 1987, Sherman and the studio decided to re-shoot at least part of the ending with a different special effects sequence. Planning and design for the new SFX make-ups took place between December 1987 and January 1988, with a possible shooting date set for early February. However, Heather O'Rourke, the child star of the film, died on February 1. Initially Sherman did not want to complete the film, but pressure from the studio prevailed, and the entire ending was re-shot in March, 1988 using a body double stand in for O'Rourke. In April, a re-edited version of the film including the new ending was submitted to the MPAA, after which it received a PG-13 rating. The finished film proved to be a critical and box office failure. Sherman has said that although he is proud of portions of the movie (particularly the creative use of mechanical "in camera" effects instead of the traditional optical effects often seen in movies of that genre), it is the least favorite of his films.

After Poltergeist III, Sherman did a string of TV pilots and television films that he wrote, produced and/or directed, as well as writing and directing the thriller Lisa for MGM.

Sherman went on to produce, direct, and write the pilot for the ABC TV series Missing Persons. After producing that series for its duration, he went on to co-executive produce the MGM/Showtime series Poltergeist: The Legacy.

For New Line Cinema and Fox TV, Sherman wrote and was executive producer for the film The Glow as well as penning the script Toxic Love, also for Fox TV.

Since 2000, when Death Line was chosen by a panel of British critics as one of "The Ten Most Important British Horror Films of the 20th Century" then was subsequently screened at Lincoln Center, many fans, including one of his most ardent, director Guillermo del Toro, have been trying to get Sherman to return to his roots, directing horror. But except for a 2006 foray into an experiment with new media, 39 - A Film by Carroll McKane, he is concentrating on areas that do not involve "dead, kill or maim."

In 2007, Sherman began teaching producing and directing classes at Columbia College Chicago.

Filmography

Theatrical films

Television films

Television series

References

External links
 

American film directors
Living people
Writers from Chicago
Columbia College Chicago faculty
1945 births